Đurađ "Đuro" Pucar "Stari" (13 December 1899 – 12 April 1979) was a Yugoslav and Bosnian politician.

During World War II he was a member of the Yugoslav Partisans and was later decorated with the Order of the People's Hero and twice with the Order of the Hero of Socialist Labour. After the war he held the position of the President of the Presidium of the Socialist Republic of Bosnia and Herzegovina from 1946–48 and from 1948–53 he served as the President of the Government of the People's Republic of Bosnia and Herzegovina.

Biography

Pucar was born on 13 December 1899 in Kesići (part of Bosansko Grahovo). He originated from a poor peasant family. After he finished elementary school he learned farriery in Baranja and Pécs in Hungary. During that time he connected with other workers and became a member of a worker's movement.

In 1920, he joined the Young Communist League of Yugoslavia, and in 1922 he became a member of the Communist Party of Yugoslavia. He was very active in the unions and for a long time he was the union's official. From 1924 to 1929 his activity was based in Subotica Because of the dissemination of leaflets by his "Bečkerečka grupa", he was sentenced to eight years in prison by the Court for Protection of the State. Because he continued his party activity with other prisoners he was sentenced to additional two years, spending ten years in prisons of Lepoglava and Sremska Mitrovica.

After he was released Pucar lived in Sarajevo illegally by order of the Communist Party of Yugoslavia. In Sarajevo he worked in the provincial committee of the Communist Party for Bosnia and Herzegovina. Soon, he was arrested by the police and returned to his hometown, however Pucar returned to Sarajevo and continue his illegal activity.

As a delegate of the Communist Party for Bosnia and Herzegovina, Pucar participated in the Fifth National Conference of the Communist Party of Yugoslavia in Zagreb in November 1940. At that conference he was elected to be a member of the Central Committee of the Communist Party of Yugoslavia. After he returned to Sarajevo he worked on popularization of the Communist Party until the start of the Invasion of Yugoslavia by Nazi Germany in April 1941.

When World War II in Yugoslavia began, Pucar was one of the main organizers of the Partisans on the territory of Bosnia and Herzegovina. When the Central Committee of the Communist Party decided to start a rebellion against the Axis forces on 4 July 1941, Pucar went to Banja Luka.

In Banja Luka, Pucar prepared a rebellion in Bosanska Krajina, and when action started he joined the Yugoslav Partisans. He was member of Partisans until the end of the war, commanding with Bosanska Krajina Partisans.

As a secretary of Regional Committee of the Communist Party for Bosanska Krajina, Pucar constantly visited the Party's organizations and recruited volunteers. He participated in the Party's consultations in Šehitluci near Banja Luka and Orlovići near Prijedor.

During the war, Pucar was one of the most notable persons in Bosanska Krajina. He organized various political and military consultations. Pucar came into conflict with the Axis forces during the Battle of Kozara and Battle for Grmeč.

He was a member of the Supreme Command of the People's Liberation Movement's  detachments of Bosnia and Herzegovina, Vice-President of ZAVNOBiH and of the Presidency of AVNOJ.

After the Communists took power at the end of the war, Pucar served on various high-ranking positions; he was the Minister without portfolio in the first Government of Bosnia and Herzegovina, President of the Presidium of the People's Assembly of the People's Republic of Bosnia and Herzegovina and Vice-President of the Presidium of the People's Assembly of FPR Yugoslavia from 1946 to September 1948.

He was also the President of the Executive Council of the People's Republic of Bosnia and Herzegovina and secretary of the Central Committee of the League of Communists of Bosnia and Herzegovina from September 1948 to December 1953.

He was the President of the Assembly of the People's Republic of Bosnia and Herzegovina again from December 1953 to June 1963.

Pucar was a member of the Executive Committee of the League of Communists of Yugoslavia and secretary of the Executive Committee of the League of Communists of Bosnia and Herzegovina.

Pucar died on 12 April 1979 in Belgrade at the Military Medical Academy and was buried in Novo groblje (New Cemetery) in Sarajevo.

Gallery

Notes

References

External links

1899 births
1979 deaths
People from Bosansko Grahovo
People from the Condominium of Bosnia and Herzegovina
Serbs of Bosnia and Herzegovina
League of Communists of Bosnia and Herzegovina politicians
Prime Ministers of Bosnia and Herzegovina
Yugoslav politicians
Yugoslav Partisans members
Bosnia and Herzegovina politicians
Bosnia and Herzegovina people of World War II
Bosnia and Herzegovina atheists
Recipients of the Order of the People's Hero
Central Committee of the League of Communists of Yugoslavia members
Chairmen of the Presidency of Bosnia and Herzegovina
Recipients of the Order of the Hero of Socialist Labour